The Denmark men's national under-18 ice hockey team is the men's national under-18 ice hockey team of Denmark. The team is controlled by the Danmarks Ishockey Union, a member of the International Ice Hockey Federation. The team represents Denmark at the IIHF World U18 Championships.

International competitions

IIHF World U18 Championships

1999: 4th in Pool B
2000: 5th in Pool B
2001: 7th in Division I
2002: 6th in Division I
2003: 1st in Division I Group A
2004: 8th place
2005: 10th place
2006: 2nd in Division I Group B

2007: 1st in Division I Group B
2008: 10th place
2009: 2nd in Division I Group B
2010: 2nd in Division I Group A
2011: 1st in Division I Group B
2012: 10th place
2013: 1st in Division I Group A
2014: 10th place
2015: 1st in Division I Group A
2016: 10th place
2017: 3rd in Division I Group A

External links
Denmark at IIHF.com

Under
National under-18 ice hockey teams